Werner Gruner (1904–1995) was a small-arms designer, mechanical engineer, university teacher and from 1958 to 1961 rector of the Dresden University of Technology.

Life and work before 1945 

Gruner was born on June 7, 1904 in the village Terpitzsch, then belonging to the municipality Zschadraß, which since January 1, 2011 is part of the town Colditz on the banks of the Zwickauer Mulde near its confluence with the Freiberger Mulde to form the Mulde 3.5 km north of the town.

His father taught in a Volksschule and he attended the Realgymnasium in Döbeln. In 1923 Gruner ended his secondary education in Leipzig with the abitur and was enrolled at the Technical University of Dresden in the same year. He studied mechanical engineering from 1923 to 1928 and after graduating (Dr.-Ing.) worked there as a research assistant for another four years till 1932, when he became a technical designer for the Metall- und Lackwarenfabrik Johannes Großfuß (Metal and lacquer ware factory Johannes Großfuß) in Döbeln.

On May 1, 1933 he joined the NSDAP. In his role as constructor at Großfuß during the 1930s Gruner is credited with the invention of the well-known MG 42 general-purpose machine gun, the development of which was ordered by the Waffenamt after shortcomings of the MG 34 had been recognized. Named like its predecessor after the year of entry into active service, the MG 42 first supplemented and later replaced the MG 34 in the last years of World War II.

In 1943 Gruner was appointed as lecturer in the field of non-cutting shaping of sheet metal at the Braunschweig University of Technology, an appointment to the RWTH Aachen University in late 1944 was hindered by the advance of the Western Allies. In May 1945 he witnessed the arrival of the Red Army in Döbeln.

Post-war decades 

In August 1945 a work commitment was imposed on Gruner by the SMAD and he was later transferred to the Soviet Union as a technical-scientific specialist from 1945 (according to another source 1946) until his return to Dresden in 1950 (according to the other source 1952). Since 1952 he lectured in the field of manufacturing technology for chipless shaping at the TU Dresden, in 1953 he became a full professor of mechanical engineering and in 1969 the head of the Institute of Agricultural Machinery Engineering.

Gruner received emeritus status in 1969, but held lectures at the Dresden University of Technology until 1978. He died in Dresden and his grave is located in the cemetery Waldfriedhof Weißer Hirsch in the eastern borough of Loschwitz above the right bank of the Elbe.

Awards 

Gruner received in 1940 and 1944 the War Merit Cross Second Class and the War Merit Cross First Class, respectively, and in 1944 the Dr. Fritz Todt-prize in silver.

In 1959 Gruner received the Patriotic Order of Merit, 1961 the National Prize of the GDR second class and in 1969 the Order of Banner of Labor. In 1972 he obtained the honorary degree Dr. Ing. h.c. from the College of Agriculture Engineering in Rostov-on-Don. In 1979 he was appointed Honorary Senator of the TU Dresden and in the same year received the Dr. h.c. from the Wilhelm Pieck University in Rostock.

Writings 

 Versuche über das maschinelle Sägen von Stein mit glattrandigen Stahlbändern und Quarzsand (Experiments on the automatic cutting of stone with smooth-edged steel bands and quartz sand), 1933
 Zehn Jahre Deutsche Demokratische Republik, zehn Jahre Technische Hochschule Dresden: Festansprache (Ten years of German Democratic Republic, ten years Technical University Dresden: commencement address), 1959
 Hochschule und Praxis: Hauptreferat anläßlich der gleichnamigen Tagung (University and practice: the keynote address on the occasion of the homonymous conference), 1960
 Mechanisierung der Landwirtschaft: Maschinen und Geräte zur Bodenbearbeitung (Mechanization of agriculture: machinery and equipment for working the soil), Hochschule für Landwirtschaftliche Produktionsgenossenschaften, 1961
 Maschinen und Geräte zur Bodenbearbeitung (Machinery and equipment for working the soil), 1961
 Probleme der Mess-, Steuerungs-und Regelungstechnik in der Landwirtschaft (Problems of measuring, control and regulation technology in agriculture), 1966

References

External links 

 Erich Höhne (Photographer), Erich Pohl (Photographer): Photo: Inauguration of the memorial for the victims of National Socialism in the execution yard of the former District Court. On the lectern Rector Werner Gruner, in front of him four Young Pioneers. Taken on October 11, 1959; Deutsche Fotothek (German photo library)

1904 births
1995 deaths
People from Colditz
People from the Kingdom of Saxony
Nazi Party members
Firearm designers
20th-century German inventors
German military engineers
Academic staff of the Technical University of Braunschweig
German expatriates in the Soviet Union
Recipients of the Patriotic Order of Merit
Recipients of the Banner of Labor
Recipients of the National Prize of East Germany
Academic staff of TU Dresden
Engineers from Leipzig